The Geological Magazine is a peer-reviewed scientific journal established in 1864, covering the earth sciences. It publishes original scientific research papers on geological topics. The journal is published bimonthly by Cambridge University Press.

External links
 
 Full online archive
 Issues 1864–1922 online available in Biodiversity Heritage Library

English-language journals
Publications established in 1864
Geology journals
Cambridge University Press academic journals
Bimonthly journals